Tharaka Mal is a 2007 Sri Lankan Sinhala romantic drama film directed by Milton Jayawardena and produced by Soma Edirisinghe for EAP Films. It stars Roshan Ranawana and Nadeesha Hemamali in lead roles along with Anarkali Akarsha and Nalin Pradeep Udawela. Music composed by Charudaththa Ilangasinghe. It is the 1088th Sri Lankan film in the Sinhala cinema.

Plot

Cast
 Roshan Ranawana as Mahasen 
 Nadeesha Hemamali as Madhavi
 Anarkali Akarsha as Suranya
 Nalin Pradeep Udawela as Kumaran
 Pubudu Chathuranga as Parthipan
 Muthu Tharanga as Parvathi
 Pradeep Senanayake as Robert Meewella
 Nimal Anthony as Navaratne Bandara
 Hyacinth Wijeratne as Agnes
 Sulakkana Mihiripenna
 Nelum Perera
 Janaka Ranasinghe as Siridasa
 Udaya Shantha

References

2007 films
2000s Sinhala-language films
2007 romantic drama films
Sri Lankan romantic drama films